The M2 expressway is a toll highway in northern Hungary, connecting Budapest to Vác and Banská Bystrica. The first section of the highway opened in 1996. It follows the route of the old Route 2 one-lane highway. The total length of the motorway now is 30 km.

Opening timeline
Budapest; M0 – Vác-észak (30 km): 1996 - half profile; 2019.10.01. - full profile

List of junctions, exits and rest area

Distance from Zero Kilometre Stone (Adam Clark Square) in Budapest in kilometres. 

 The route is full length expressway.

 Planned section

Maintenance
The operation and maintenance of the road by Hungarian Public Road Nonprofit Pte Ltd Co. This activity is provided by this highway engineer.
 near Gödöllő (M3), kilometre trench 27

Payment
Hungarian system has 2 main type in terms of salary:

1, time-based fee vignettes (E-matrica); with a validity of either 10 days (3500 HUF), 1 month (4780 HUF) or 1 year (42980 HUF).

2, county vignettes (Megyei matrica); the highway can be used instead of the national sticker with the following county stickers:

{| class="wikitable"
|- 
!Type of county vignette !! Available section
|-
|Pest County
| full length (17 km – 48 km)
|}

European Route(s)

See also 

 Roads in Hungary
 Transport in Hungary
 International E-road network

External links 

National Toll Payment Services Plc. (in Hungarian, some information also in English)
 Hungarian Public Road Non-Profit Ltd. (Magyar Közút Nonprofit Zrt.)
 National Infrastructure Developer Ltd.

2